Bommalagutta also known as Siddhula Gutta, Bommalamma Talli gutta and Vrishabhadri hill a Jain centre situated near Kurikyala village of Karimnagar district in Telangana. This Jain center is situated 3 km from another famous Jain center Kulpakji.

Etymology
Bommalagutta "Hill of figures" is named with reference to the Bommalu (figures) carved on this hillock. As per inscription the site was originally known as Siddhashila or Siddhula Gutta "Hill of enlightened" is named with reference to the Siddha carved on this hillock.

History 
Bommalagutta was constructed during the reign of Arikesari II of Vemulavada Chalukya. According to an inscription dated 945 CE, Telugu poet Jina vallabha, brother of noted Kannada poet Adikavi Pampa, installed stone images of Bharata, Bahubali and Rishabhanatha. The famous trilingual inscription is a  inscription having 11 lines as a tribute to the kingdom for recognising poets. The inscription has verses composed in Sanskrit, Telugu and Kannada languages. The inscription also mention the construction of Tribhuvanatilaka Basadi by Jina vallabha. The top of the hill was used by Jain monks for meditation.

Architecture 
The temple is famous for stone carving image of Chakreshvari with eight arms under two Bahubali images. Her iconography here includes Garuda. The bas-reliefs and the inscription have been painted over in red by the state officials in recent years for preservation and highlighting it. There is a total of eight Tirthankaras carved on the hillock. The hill still preserves a few small Jain caves without any carvings.

Tribhuvanatilaka Basadi exists near the Jain reliefs of Bommalagutta. This temple houses idols of Rishabhanatha and Mahavira. A tank called Kavitagunarnava and a garden named Madanvilas is also part of the temple premises.

Gallery

Preservation 
Over the last 100 years, Jain statues and reliefs are discovered from the area, are preserved in the Karimnagar museum.

See also 
 Kalugumalai Jain Beds
 Kulpakji

References

Citations

Sources

External links 
 

Jain temples in Telangana
10th-century Jain temples
Jain rock-cut architecture